Kunene is one of the fourteen regions of Namibia. Its capital is Opuwo, its governor is Marius Sheya. The region's name comes from the Kunene River which forms the northern border with Angola. Besides the capital Opuwo, the region contains the municipality of Outjo, the town Khorixas and the self-governed village Kamanjab. Kunene is home to the Himba people, a subtribe of the Herero. , Kunene had 58,548 registered voters.

Kunene's western edge is the shores of the Atlantic Ocean. In the north, it borders Angola's Namibe Province, and in the far eastern part of its northern edge it borders Cunene Province. Domestically, it borders the following regions:
Omusati - northeast, west of Oshana
Oshana - northeast, between Omusati and Oshikoto
Oshikoto - northeast, east of Oshikoto
Otjozondjupa - east
Erongo - south

Politics

The region comprises seven constituencies:
 Epupa
 Kamanjab
 Khorixas
 Opuwo Rural
 Opuwo Urban
 Outjo
 Sesfontein

Kunene is one of few regions that Namibia's ruling SWAPO party does not dominate. Previously the rivalry was mainly with the United Democratic Front (UDF), but recently other parties show good results in Kunene's constituencies. In November 2008, SWAPO activists and politicians called for organization to "destroy" the UDF government in Kunene. SWAPO also claimed that UDF and Democratic Turnhalle Alliance (DTA) were "sabotaging" local government initiatives in the region due to incompetence.

Central to the politics of Kunene Region is the battle over the proposed Epupa Dam in Epupa Constituency near the border with Angola. Business leaders based in Opuwo, who are mostly Ovambo people, formed the Kaoko Development League which supports the proposed dam. The dam would bring in economic development to much of the Region but would interfere with the traditional way of life of the Himba people who reside in the area. A longtime rivalry exists between SWAPO and the Himba people.

National elections
In the 2004 election for the National Assembly of Namibia, voters in Kunene Region supported numerous parties. The UDF earned the party's single highest vote total and 22.19% of the party's national vote total in the region.

Regional elections
The only members of the 3rd National Council of Namibia, which was created by appointments from every regional council, who were not members of SWAPO were chosen by the Kunene Regional Council. These Councillors were Sebastian Ignatius ǃGobs of the UDF and Ngohauvi Lydia Kavetu of the DTA. 

In the 2015 regional elections SWAPO obtained 46% of the total votes (2010: 42%) and won in five of the seven constituencies while the DTA won two. The two Kunene constituencies Epupa and Opuwo Rural were the only ones the DTA won throughout Namibia. In the 2020 regional election SWAPO obtained 34% of the total votes and won only Outjo Constituency. The Popular Democratic Movement (PDM, the new name of the DTA) and the UDF won three constituencies each.

Governors
Themistokles Dudu Murorua, a UDF member, was appointed governor of Kunene Region in 2005. He was later replaced by Joshua ǁHoebeb. Following the 2014 elections and SWAPO's win in Kunene, Angelika Muharukua was appointed governor, and after her death in 2017, Marius Sheya was appointed.

Health
Cholera is a major concern in Kunene Region, particularly near the border with Angola. In December 2008, while the Zimbabwean cholera outbreak caused the deaths of hundreds of Zimbabweans, a similar but separate outbreak occurred in the northern Kunene Region constituency of Epupa. As 19 December, 3 people had died and 29 had become sick. In May 2008, approximately 15 people died of cholera as well.

Human Rights
February 2012, traditional Himba chiefs issued two separate Declarations to the African Union and to the OHCHR of the United Nations.

The first, titled "Declaration of the most affected Ovahimba, Ovatwa, Ovatjimba and Ovazemba against the Orokawe Dam in the Baynes Mountains" outlines the objections from regional Himba chiefs and communities that reside near the Kunene River.

The second, titled "Declaration by the traditional Himba leaders of Kaokoland in Namibia" lists violations of civil, cultural, economic, environmental, social and political rights perpetrated by the Government of Namibia (GoN).

September 2012, the United Nations special rapporteur on the Rights of Indigenous Peoples visited the Himba, and heard their concerns that they do not have recognized traditional authorities, and that they are placed under the jurisdictions of chiefs of neighboring dominant tribes, who make decisions on behalf of the minority communities. In his view, the lack of recognition of traditional chiefs is, in accordance with Namibian law, relates to a lack of recognition of the minority indigenous tribes' communal lands.

November 23, 2012, hundreds of Himba and Zemba from Omuhonga and Epupa region protested in Okanguati against Namibia’s plans to construct a dam in the Kunene River in the Baynes Mountains, against increasing mining operations on their traditional land and human rights violations against them.

March 25, 2013, over thousand Himba and Zemba people marched in protest again, this time in Opuwo, against the ongoing human rights violations that they endure in Namibia. They expressed their frustration over their traditional chiefs not being recognized as "Traditional Authorities" by the Government of Namibia, Namibia's plans to build the Orokawe dam in the Baynes Mountains at the Cunene River without consulting with the Himba that do not consent to the construction plans, culturally inappropriate education, the illegal fencing of parts of their traditional land, the lack of land rights to the territory that they have lived upon for centuries, and against the implementation of the Communal Land Reform Act of 2002.

Economy and infrastructure
Compared to the rest of Namibia, Kunene is relatively underdeveloped. This is due to the mountainous inaccessible geography and the dryness that significantly hinders agriculture.

In 2012, Chinese company Namibia East China Non- Ferrous Investments explored the Kunene region discovering enough a deposit of 2.37 billion tons of iron ore, enough for the next 100 years. A cobalt deposit is being developed by Gecko Opuwo Cobal.

Kunene has 60 schools with a total of 20,332 pupils.

Demographics
According to the Namibia 2001 Population and Housing Census, Kunene had a population of 68,735 (34,237 females and 34,487 males or 101 males for every 100 females) growing at an annual rate of 1.9%. The fertility rate was 4.7 children per woman. 25% lived in urban areas while 75% lived in rural areas, and with an area of 115,293 km2, the population density was 0.6 persons per km2. By age, 15% of the population was under 5 years old, 26% between 5–14 years, 48% between 15–59 years, and 7% 60 years and older. The population was divided into 12,489 households, with an average size of 5.3 persons. 40% of households had a female head of house, while 60% had a male. For those 15 years and older, 52% had never married, 12% married with certificate, 17% married traditionally, 12% married consensually, 2% were divorced or separated, and 4% were widowed.

The most commonly spoken languages at home were Otjiherero languages (42% of households) and Nama/Damara (36%). For those 15 years and older, the literacy rate was 57%. In terms of education, 51% of girls and 49% of boys between the ages of 6-15 were attending school, and of those older than 15, 45% had left school, 9% were currently at school, and 41% had never attended. In 2001 the employment rate for the labor force (56% of those 15+) was 77% employed and 23% unemployed. For those 15+ years old and not in the labor force (24%), 19% were students, 56% homemakers, and 25% retired, too old, or other categories. According to the 2012 Namibia Labour Force Survey, unemployment in the Kunene Region stood at 27.0%. The two studies are methodologically not comparable.

Among households, 73% had safe water, 66% no toilet facility, 22% electricity for lighting, 72% access to radio, and 81% had wood or charcoal for cooking. In terms of household's main sources of income, 35% derived it from farming, 37% from wages and salaries, 7% cash remittances, 7% from business or non-farming, and 10% from pension.

For every 1,000 live births there were 49 female infant deaths and 61 male. The life expectancy at birth was 57 years for females and 50 for males. Among children younger than 15, 2% had lost a mother, 5% a father, and 1% were orphaned by both parents. 5% of the entire population had a disability, of which 18% were deaf, 35% blind, 16% had a speech disability, 18% hand disability, 27% leg disability, and 5% mental disability.

According to the Namibia 2011 Population and Housing Census, Kunene had a population of 86,856 (43,253 females and 43,603 males or 101 males for every 100 females) growing at an annual rate of 2.3%. The fertility rate was 4.9 children per woman. 26% lived in urban areas while 74% lived in rural areas, and with an area of 115,293 km2, the population density was 0.8 persons per km2. By age, 17% of the population was under 5 years old, 25% between 5–14 years, 51% between 15–59 years, and 7% 60 years and older. The population was divided into 18,495 households, with an average size of 4.6 persons. 40% of households had a female head of house, while 60% had a male. For those 15 years and older, 56% had never married, 13% married with certificate, 18% married traditionally, 8% married consensually, 2% were divorced or separated, and 3% were widowed.

The most commonly spoken languages at home were Otjiherero languages (47% of households) and Nama/Damara (32%). For those 15 years and older, the literacy rate was 65%. In terms of education, 51% of girls and 49% of boys between the ages of 6-15 were attending school, and of those older than 15, 50% had left school, 9% were currently at school, and 37% had never attended. In 2011 the employment rate for the labor force (67% of those 15+) was 64% employed and 36% unemployed. For those 15+ years old and not in the labor force (24%), 31% were students, 30% homemakers, and 31% retired, too old, or other categories. According to the 2012 Namibia Labour Force Survey, unemployment in the Kunene Region stood at 27.0%. The two studies are methodologically not comparable.

Villages
 

Otjomotjira

Gallery

References

External links

 
Regions of Namibia
States and territories established in 1992
1992 establishments in Namibia